Cinerama are an English indie pop band, headed up by David Gedge, the frontman for The Wedding Present. The band is known for combining rock guitar music with string and woodwind sounds.

Career
Originally formed in 1998, Cinerama began as a duo comprising David Gedge and Sally Murrell. Initial releases were stylistically different from The Wedding Present, featuring soundtrack-like arrangements with string and woodwind accompaniment. Live performances included the many musicians required to create the orchestral accompaniment present in the recordings. Over time the band's sound returned to rock, with songs originally recorded by The Wedding Present incorporated into Cinerama's live set.

During the recording of the album that became Take Fountain, Gedge decided that the band's sound had changed so much that the album should be released as The Wedding Present.

Post 2004 
Most Wedding Present set lists during this time included at least one Cinerama song.

The band played and recorded occasionally and performed a short set at each of David Gedge's "At the edge of.." festivals. The line up usually comprised the current Wedding Present lineup but with the musicians switching their usual instruments.

On 18 May 2015, Cinerama released a re-vamped version of the Wedding Present's album Valentina.

Discography

Singles
 "Kerry Kerry" (Cooking Vinyl 1998) – UK Singles Chart No. 71
 "Dance, Girl, Dance" (Cooking Vinyl 1998)
 "Pacific/King's Cross" (double a-side 7" vinyl / Elefant 1999)
 "Manhattan" (Scopitones 2000)
 "Wow" (Scopitones 2000)
 "Lollobrigida" (Scopitones 2000)
 "Your Charms" (Scopitones 2000)
 "Superman" (Scopitones 2001)
 "Health and Efficiency" (Scopitones 2001)
 "Quick, Before It Melts" (Scopitones 2002)
 "Careless" (Scopitones 2002)
 "Don't Touch That Dial" (Scopitones 2003)
 "It's Not You, It's Me" (GoMetric! Records 2004)

Albums
Studio albums
 Va Va Voom (Cooking Vinyl 1998)
 Disco Volante (Scopitones 2000)
 Torino (Scopitones 2002)
 Valentina (Scopitones, 2015)

Compilations
 This Is Cinerama (compilation, Cooking Vinyl 2000)
 John Peel Sessions (compilation, Scopitones 2001)
 Cinerama Holiday (compilation, Scopitones 2002)
 John Peel Sessions: Season 2 (compilation, Scopitones 2003)
 John Peel Sessions: Season 3 (compilation, Sanctuary 2007)
 The Complete Peel Sessions (triple album box set compilation, Sanctuary 2007)
 Seven Wonders of the World (compilation, Scopitones 2014)

Live albums
 Live in Los Angeles (Scopitones 2002)
 Live in Belfast (Scopitones 2003)
 Live in New York (Download Album 2010)
 Live 2015 (Scopitones, 2015)

DVDs
 Get Up and Go (Scopitones 2004)

Members
The band has included the following members:
 David Gedge (1998–date)
 Andrew Black (2000–date)
 Melanie Howard (2014–date)
 Maria Scaroni (2017–date)
 Bryan McLellan (1998–1999)
 Sally Murrell (1998–2003) 
 Philip Robinson (1998–2000)
 Terry de Castro (1998–2018)
 Simon Cleave (1998–2004)
 Richard Marcangelo (2000)
 Kari Paavola (2000–2004)
 Graeme Ramsey (2006–2011)
 Charles Layton (2009–2019)
 Samuel Beer-Pearce (2012–2016)
 Danielle Wadey (2013–2019)
 Katharine Walliger (2014–2016)
 Simon Pearson
 Nick Wellauer

See also
Baroque pop

References

External links
Scopitones – the home of The Wedding Present and Cinerama
TWP-CINERAMA Japan fan site

English pop music groups
Musical groups established in 1998
Musical groups disestablished in 2004
Musical groups reestablished in 2015
Cooking Vinyl artists